Rajnandini is a Bengali romantic drama film directed by Sukhen Das. This film was released in 1980 in the banner of S.D Films.

Cast
 Uttam Kumar
 Bikash Roy
 Subhendu Chatterjee
 Sabitri Chatterjee
 Sukhen Das
 Chhaya Devi
 Shakuntala Barua
 Anamika Saha
 Sumitra Mukherjee
 Sisir Batabyal

References

External links

1980 films
1980 romantic drama films
Indian romantic drama films
Bengali-language Indian films
1980s Bengali-language films